X Riigikogu was the tenth legislature of the Estonian Parliament (Riigikogu). The legislature was elected after 2003 election.

Election results

Officers
Speaker of the Riigikogu: Ene Ergma.

List of members of the Riigikogu

References

Riigikogu